Karen L. Cox is a historian and professor at the University of North Carolina at Charlotte who specializes in and has written extensively on Southern history. Cox received her Bachelors and Masters from UNC Greensboro and her Ph.D. from the University of Southern Mississippi. Cox's most recent book, No Common Ground, addresses the intersection between racial justice and the legacy of Confederate monuments, which she first explored when she wrote about the United Daughters of the Confederacy.

Other publications include: Dreaming of Dixie and The South and Mass Culture about the portrayal of the American South.

References

External links

University of North Carolina faculty
University of North Carolina alumni
University of Southern Mississippi alumni
Year of birth missing (living people)
Living people